"Say You're Just a Friend" is a song by American singer-songwriter Austin Mahone from his extended play Extended Play. The song features vocals from American rapper Flo Rida. The song was written by Flo Rida, DJ Frank E, Nick Bailey, Mike Freesh, Trent Mazur, Ryan Ogren, Ahmad Belvin and produced by DJ Frank E, Mike Freesh, Trent Mazur. The song was released in the United States as a digital download on December 3, 2012. The song interpolates the chorus of the hit song "Just a Friend" by rapper Biz Markie, which itself interpolates (You) Got What I Need, written by Gamble and Huff and performed by soul singer Freddie Scott. Therefore, Gamble and Huff are credited as songwriters. The song was used in the second episode in Season 3 of the American television drama series Empire.

Music video
A music video to accompany the release of "Say You're Just a Friend" was first released onto YouTube on February 8, 2013 at a total length of three minutes and sixteen seconds. The girl starring as Mahone's love interest is model Kimberly Schanks.

A second music video was released online on February 27; this time it's the video of the piano version of the song.

Track listing
Digital download
 "Say You're Just a Friend" featuring Flo Rida – 3:02

Credits and personnel
 Lead vocals – Austin Mahone, Flo Rida
 Lyrics – Austin Mahone, Gamble and Huff, Flo Rida, DJ Frank E, Nick Bailey, Mike Freesh, Trent Mazur, Ryan Ogren, Ahmad Belvin
 Producers – DJ Frank E, Mike Freesh, Trent Mazur
 Label: Chase, Universal Republic Records, Republic Records

Awards and nominations

Charts

Certifications

Release history

References

External links
 Say You're Just a Friend Music Video on MTV

2012 singles
2010 songs
Austin Mahone songs
Flo Rida songs
Republic Records singles
Song recordings produced by DJ Frank E
Songs written by Leon Huff
Songs written by Kenny Gamble
Songs written by Flo Rida
Songs written by Ryan Ogren
Songs written by DJ Frank E
Songs written by Nick Bailey